Soundtrack from the Film Mabuta no Ura is the ninth studio album by Japanese experimental band Boris, released on June 29, 2005, through Catune and Inoxia and on November 12 of the same year through Essence Music. The album includes the song "A Bao A Qu" which shares the same name as the version included on the album The Thing Which Solomon Overlooked. However, both versions are quite different from one another. The band used this version of the song "A Bao A Qu" and created a 7" single with an extended version of the track. A music video was also released for this song but it is based on the 7" single. There is yet another version of the song which was included on the 2010 compilation, Boris / Variations + Live in Japan, and a live recording is included in Archive II. The 2016 re-release of Pink includes a bonus disc with the track "Your Name Part 2," apparently a sequel to the track of that name from this album.

Album title
Though the title describes the album as a soundtrack for the film Mabuta no Ura (lit. "Under the Eyelids"), no such film exists. The album is rather the result of the band imagining a film in their heads and writing a soundtrack for it. Because of this, the band has classified this as a concept album. The album's concept is also driven by photography and art-styling which is included on a version of the album.

Release
Two versions of this album exist. The first one is the version of the album was released on CD by the label Catune. This version was housed on brown packaging which included story cards with photos and the stories and lyrics in Japanese. Inoxia released this version of the album on an LP limited to 600 copies with a different cover and photo book. The second version was released by the Brazilian label Essence Music, limited to 2000 copies, this version has a different arrangement and song list to the other versions mentioned above. This version shows the same cover as the LP version and includes numerous photos, story card materials, and lyrics in English. They also made a special box-set edition limited to 199 hand-numbered copies that contained art prints, flyers, and a bunch of dead flowers.

Track listing

Personnel

 Atsuo - Drums and Percussion
 Takeshi - Guitar, Bass and Vocals
 Wata - Guitar and Effects
 Fangsanalsatan - Photography
 Artwork by Regina
 Recorded and Mixed by Fangsanalsatan
 Produced by Boris
 Mastered By Souichirou Nakamura
 Translated By – Yoshiko Ikeda
 Thanks to Kensuke Saito
 Taisei Umeki - Story: A Home That Is Far
 Touko Aimiya - Story: A Midnight Cat
 Chihiro Suda - Story: Lowering Her Eyes, She's Smiling
 Kouhei Igarashi - Story: The Trail

Pressing History

References

External links
 

2005 albums
Boris (band) albums
Experimental music albums
Concept albums